Natriciteres fuliginoides, the collared marsh snake, is a species of natricine snake found in Guinea, Ghana, Togo, Nigeria, Cameroon, Central African Republic, Democratic Republic of the Congo, Republic of the Congo, Gabon, Sierra Leone, and Liberia.

References

Natriciteres
Reptiles described in 1858
Taxa named by Albert Günther